Havrylo Kachur (11 March 1954) is a former professional Soviet football defender and coach.

Career 
Havrylo Kachur began his adult football career in 1972 with the backup team of SKA (Rostov-on-Don), in which he scored 1 goal.

From 1973 to 1976, he played in the clubs SKA Lviv, FC Volyn Lutsk, FSC Bukovyna Chernivtsi and FC Karpaty Lviv.

In 1977, he joined the representative of the Soviet Top League FC Chornomorets Odesa. During his stay in Odesa in the USSR championship he played 54 matches and scored 3 goals, played 3 more matches in the USSR Cup.

In 1980, he moved to another representative of the Soviet Top League, Baku's Neftchi.

From 1980 to 1982, he played in the second league FC Podillya Khmelnytskyi (51 matches, 4 goals) and amateur club "Harvest" (Kolchyno).

In 1982, he moved to Lviv SKA-Karpaty, which played in the first league of the USSR championship.

From 1992 he worked as a coach, and from 1994 to 1995 he was a head coach of the club "Karpaty" (Mukachevo).

References

External links
 
 Havrylo Kachur at the Odesskiy futbol

1954 births
Living people
Ukrainian people of Hungarian descent
Soviet footballers
FC SKA Rostov-on-Don players
SC Lutsk players
SKA Lviv players
FC SKA-Karpaty Lviv players
FC Karpaty Lviv players
FC Bukovyna Chernivtsi players
FC Chornomorets Odesa players
FC Podillya Khmelnytskyi players
FC Karpaty Mukacheve players
Soviet Top League players
Ukrainian football managers
FC Karpaty Mukacheve managers
Association football defenders
Neftçi PFK players
Sportspeople from Zakarpattia Oblast